Vassilis Charalampopoulos may refer to:

Vassilis Charalampopoulos (actor), Greek actor
Vassilis Charalampopoulos (basketball), Greek basketball player